Tuya (also called Tuy or Muat-Tuya) was the wife of Pharaoh Seti I of the Nineteenth Dynasty of Egypt and mother of Tia, Ramesses II, and perhaps Henutmire. 

She was the daughter of Raia, who was a military officer based on his title of Lieutenant of the chariotry. Tuya's daughter Tia was married to a high-ranking civil servant who was also called Tia.

As the mother of Ramesses II, she enjoyed a privileged existence of a respected king's mother and was allowed the opportunity to correspond with the Hittite royal court after the Year 21 peace treaty between Egypt and Hatti put in place by Ramesses II.

Monuments and inscriptions

 Statue, Vatican Museum no. 28 with figure of Henutmire. The inscription identifies Queen Tuya as: Mother of the King of South and North Egypt, Queen Mother of the King of South and North Egypt (even of) the Horus-Falcon, Strong Bull, Lord of Both Lands, Usermaatre Setepenre, Lord of Crowns, Ramesses II, given life like Re; The God's Wife and Great Royal Wife, Lady of Both Lands, Tuya, may she live.

 At the Ramesseum, fragments of North Side-Chapel of Queen Mother Tuya were found. Ramesses II had this chapel dedicated to his mother. A scene in this chapel records the name of Tuya's father and mother.

 The Ramesseum contains scenes of the Divine Birth of the Pharaoh.

 A statue and base block, found in Tanis but originally from Piramesse. Her titles are given as Hereditary Princess, Chief of the Harem, greatly favoured, God's Wife and Queen Mother, Great Royal Wife, etc.

 In Abydos Tuya's name appears on fragments of a limestone statue and in texts in Ramesses II's temple.

 In the Ramesseum Tuya's name appears on fragments of a colossus and in scenes on the main (central) doorway into the great hypostyle hall.

 A statue inscribed with the name and titles of Tuya was found at Medinet Habu, but likely originated from the Ramesseum.

 Queen Tuya appears on two of the collosi flanking the entrance to the temple at Abu Simbel.

 A sandstone lintel from Deir el-Medina records the names of Ramesses II and Tuya.

 A jamb now in Vienna (Inv. 5091) shows Ramesses II followed by Tuya, making an offering to Osiris.

 A carved alabaster canopic jar stopper in the form of her head, today resides in the collection of the Luxor Museum.

 ̈Stela found at Kafr el-Gebel (3 km south of Giza), showing her together with the overseer of the treasury Tia and his wife Tia (a daughter of Tuya).

Death and burial

Tuya likely died soon after Year 22 of Ramesses' reign and was buried in an impressive tomb in the Valley of the Queens (QV80). In her tomb, Tuya "was stripped of the first part of her name to become plain Tuya for eternity; the loss of the prefix Mut- suggests that her death had ended in an almost divine earthly status."

In popular culture
Queen Tuya has been first portrayed by actress Irene Martin in Cecil B. DeMille's The Ten Commandments, as one of Bithiah's maidservants famous for quoting "Bithiah could charm tears from a crocodile". 

She also appears in The Prince of Egypt as the adoptive mother of Moses, voiced by Helen Mirren. She is portrayed by Sigourney Weaver in the 2014 Ridley Scott film Exodus: Gods and Kings; In 2015, the Brazilian television series, Os Dez Mandamentos , the Queen Tuya is played by actress Angelina Muniz.

References

Bibliography
 Grajetzki, Wolfram (2005) Ancient Egyptian Queens – a hieroglyphic dictionary

Queens consort of the Nineteenth Dynasty of Egypt
Seti I
13th-century BC Egyptian women
Pharaoh's daughter (Exodus)